, is a Japanese stunt actor and action director best known for his career as the suit actor for the first 15 red warriors in the Super Sentai series. He is the president of his own action/stunt troupe called .

Filmography

Action director

TV Drama
Kyōryū Sentai Zyuranger (1992)
Blue SWAT (1994)
Ninja Sentai Kakuranger (1994)
Chōriki Sentai Ohranger (1995)
Juukou B-Fighter (1995)
B-Fighter Kabuto (1996)
Gekisou Sentai Carranger (1996)
Purple Eyes in the Dark (1996)
Seijuu Sentai Gingaman (1998)
Voicelugger (1999)
Hyakujuu Sentai Gaoranger (2001)
Ninpuu Sentai Hurricaneger (2002)
Kamen Rider Blade (2004)
Tokusou Sentai Dekaranger (2004)
Mahou Sentai Magiranger (2005)
Juken Sentai Gekiranger (2007)
Kamen Rider Kiva (2008)

Film
Engine Sentai Go-onger: Boom Boom! Bang Bang! GekijōBang!! (2008)

Actor

TV Drama
Kaizoku Sentai Gokaiger (2011) - Masa (episode 34)
Unofficial Sentai Akibaranger (2012) - Himself

Film
Juken Sentai Gekiranger: Nei-Nei! Hou-Hou! Hong Kong Decisive Battle (2007) - Martial artist
Heisei Riders vs. Shōwa Riders: Kamen Rider Taisen feat. Super Sentai (2014) - Worker

Stunt actor

TV Drama
Kenji-kun (1971)
Playgirl (1971)
Kamen Rider (1971) - Shocker Combatman, Kamen Rider 1, Kamen Rider 2
Kamen Rider V3 (1973) - Kamen Rider 1
Kamen Rider X (1974) - Kamen Rider X
Kamen Rider Amazon (1974) - Kamen Rider Amazon
Himitsu Sentai Gorenger (1975) - Akarenger
Kamen Rider Stronger (1975) - Kamen Rider Stronger
Daitetsujin 17 (1977) - 17
Battle Fever J (1979) - Battle Japan
Denshi Sentai Denziman (1980) - Denzi Red
Taiyo Sentai Sun Vulcan (1981) - Vul Eagle
Dai Sentai Goggle-V (1982) - Goggle Red
Kagaku Sentai Dynaman (1983) - Dyna Red
Choudenshi Bioman (1984) - Red One
Dengeki Sentai Changeman (1985) - Change Dragon
Choushinsei Flashman (1986) - Red Flash
Hikari Sentai Maskman (1987) - Red Mask
Choujuu Sentai Liveman (1988) - Red Falcon
Kousoku Sentai Turboranger (1989) - Red Turbo
Chikyū Sentai Fiveman (1990) - Five Red
Chōjin Sentai Jetman (1991) - Red Hawk

Film
ESPY
Himitsu Sentai Gorenger: The Movie (1975) - Akarenger
Himitsu Sentai Gorenger: The Blue Fortress (1975) - Akarenger
Himitsu Sentai Gorenger: The Red Death Match (1976) - Akarenger
Himitsu Sentai Gorenger: Fire Mountain's Deadly Explosion (1976) - Akarenger
Himitsu Sentai Gorenger: The Bomb Hurricane (1976) - Akarenger
Battle Fever J (1979) - Battle Japan
Denshi Sentai Denziman (1980) - Denzi Red
Taiyo Sentai Sun Vulcan (1981) - Vul Eagle
Dai Sentai Goggle-V (1982) - Goggle Red
Kagaku Sentai Dynaman (1983) - Dyna Red
Choudenshi Bioman (1984) - Red One
Dengeki Sentai Changeman (1985) - Change Dragon
Dengeki Sentai Changeman: Shuttle Base! Close Call (1985) - Change Dragon
Choushinsei Flashman (1986) - Red Flash
Choushinsei Flashman: Big Rally! Titan Boy (1986) - Red Flash
Hikari Sentai Maskman (1987) - Red Mask
Kousoku Sentai Turboranger (1989) - Red Turbo
Kamen Rider Kiva: King of the Castle in the Demon World (2008) - Kamen Rider Arc
Gokaiger Goseiger Super Sentai 199 Hero Great Battle (2011) - Akarenger, Red Turbo
Kamen Rider × Super Sentai: Super Hero Taisen (2012)

V-Cinema
Hyakujuu Sentai Gaoranger vs. Super Sentai (2001) - Red Falcon

References

External links
Official Profile at Red Entertainment Deliver 

1955 births
Living people
Japanese male actors
People from Ibaraki Prefecture
Action choreographers
Actors from Ibaraki Prefecture